"Time Is Running Out" is the seventh track from Californian rock band Papa Roach's fifth album, The Paramour Sessions. The song is also available as a downloadable track for the Rock Band games.

Chart performance

References

Papa Roach songs
2007 songs
Songs written by Tobin Esperance
Songs written by Jacoby Shaddix
Song recordings produced by Howard Benson
Geffen Records singles